Oslo Grand Prix is an annual Group One harness event that takes place at Bjerke Racetrack in Oslo, Norway. The competition was inaugurated in 1966 and is regarded as Norway's biggest trotting event. It is raced over 2,100 meters and is part of the European Grand Circuit. The overall purse for the 2009 event was 2.87 million Norwegian kroner (NOK), equalling approximately US$427,000 or €308,000. The fastest winning time in the history of the race is 1:11.5, run by L'Amiral Mauzun in 2008.

Racing conditions
Oslo Grand Prix is since 1981 been decided through a race over 2,100 meter. Before that, the event had different looks. In the debut year, 1966, the event consisted of two heats over different distances (1,600 and 2,100 meters). The same eight horses competed in both heats and the winner was the horse with the best total ranking. These conditions were altered the second year, 1967. Two heats were still used, but this year they were over 1,700 and 2,100 meters, with richer horses starting 20 meters behind. 1973 the event went back to being decided over one 1,600 and one 2,100 heat. Between 1976 and 1980, 16 horses competed, divided into two elimination heats, from which a number of horses progressed to the final the same day. In 1976, both the eliminations and the final were over 1,700 meters. In 1978 autostart (a motorized gate) was introduced, and the Oslo Grand Prixs of 1978-1980 consisted of eliminations heat over 1,600 meters followed by finals over 2,100 meters. From 1981, the present conditions have been ruling. One single race over 2,100 meters, started by a motorized gate.

The 2012 Oslo Grand Prix
May 13 2012

  Roxane Grif - Eric Raffin
  Yarrah Boko - Kai Johansen
  Quarcio du Chene - Björn Goop
  Timoko - Richard Westerink
  Arch Madness - Trond Smedshammer
  Commander Crowe - Christophe Martens
  Viking Frecel - Vidar Hop
  Windsong Geant - Rick Zeron
  Beanie M.M. - Johnny Takter
  Joke Face - Lutfi Kolgjini

Past winners

Horses with most wins
 2 - Copiad (1994, 1995)
 2 - Gidde Palema (2003, 2004)
 2 - Grande Frances (1976, 1978)
 2 - Rex Rodney (1986, 1987)

Drivers with most wins
 3 - Åke Svanstedt (1997, 2003, 2004)
 2 - Erik Berglöf (1994, 1995)
 2 - Kjell Håkonsen (1985, 1986)
 2 - Stig H. Johansson (1991, 2000)
 2 - Gösta Nordin (1967, 1969)
 2 - Sören Nordin (1972, 1973)
 2 - Ulf Thoresen (1976, 1978)
 2 - Joseph Verbeeck (1992, 1998)

Sires with most winning offsprings
 2 - Nevele Pride (Hickory Almahurst, Meadow Roland)
 2 - Noble Victory (E.O. Brunn, Noble Action)
 2 - Texas (Nordin Hanover, Copiad)

Countries, number of wins
Based on the nationalities of the winning horses' owners:

 24 - 
 6 - 
 4 - 
 3 - 
 2 - 
 1 - 
 1 - 
 1 - 
 1 -

Fastest winner

Auto start (1978-)

Short distance (1,600 m)
 1:15,8 (km rate) - Madison Avenue (1978) and Gadames (1980)

Middle distance (2,100 m)
 1:11.5 (km rate) - L'Amiral Mauzun (2008)

Volt start (1966-1976)

Short distance (1,600 - 1,700 m)
 1:18.1 (km rate) - Noble Action (1972)

Middle distance (≈2,100 m)
 1:20,6 (km rate) - Molnets Broder (1975) (won the longer of that year's two races and finished second overall)

All winners of Oslo Grand Prix

See also
 List of Scandinavian harness horse races

References

Harness races in Norway